The 2012 Aragon motorcycle Grand Prix was the fourteenth round of the 2012 Grand Prix motorcycle racing season. It took place on the weekend of 28–30 September 2012 at the Motorland Aragón circuit.

Classification

MotoGP

Moto2

Moto3

Championship standings after the race (MotoGP)
Below are the standings for the top five riders and constructors after round fourteen has concluded.

Riders' Championship standings

Constructors' Championship standings

 Note: Only the top five positions are included for both sets of standings.

References

Aragon motorcycle Grand Prix
Aragon
Aragon
Aragon motorcycle Grand Prix